Data Protector software (originally Omniback) is automated backup and recovery software for single-server to enterprise environments, supporting disk storage or tape storage targets.  It provides cross-platform, online backup of data for Microsoft Windows, Unix, and Linux operating systems. The last version to use the OmniBack name was version 4.1, which was retired in 2004.

History 
When Hewlett-Packard acquired Apollo Computer in 1989, the latter had already developed a backup system entitled the "OmniBack Network Backup System," which was available on the market at the time. HP continued to develop this product under the "OmniBack" name for the purpose of backing up individual files and raw disk partitions. A related but distinct product "OmniBack/Turbo" was developed for backing up databases.

In 1996 HP released OmniBack II 2.0 and merged OmniBack II and OmniBack/Turbo into a single product, although it was still impossible to create a single job which would contain a database and a file system backup. It was offered for $3,800. A Windows NT port was released with version 2.3. Version 2.55 was released in 1997 and included support for HP-UX and IBM AIX.

In the interim, Hewlett-Packard withdrew development from Slovenia through to Germany. Significant time was spent delivering version 3.5.2 for Solaris. Once complete however, this allowed quick ports through to Tru64 and Linux.

With version 5.0, the OmniBack name was dropped. Since then, the product has been called HP Openview Storage Data Protector and HP StorageWorks Data Protector, or commonly just HP Data Protector.

HP announced the release of HP Data Protector 9.0 (as a part of its Adaptive Backup & Recovery initiative) in May 2014. It was released in July 2014 along with two companion products: HP Data Protector Management Pack and HP Backup Navigator.

Since Micro Focus acquired HPE Software in 2017, it is now named Micro Focus Data Protector.

References

External links
 Micro Focus Data Protector webpage

Data Protector
Backup software